This is a bibliography of selected works about Nicaragua.

Bibliography

Asleson, Vern. (2004) Nicaragua: Those Passed By. Galde Press 

 free access: https://www.academia.edu/1621806/NICARAGUA_1979-1990._LA_REVOLUCIÓN_ENREDADA

See also 

 List of books and films about Nicaragua

References 

Nicaragua